Italy participated in all Jeux sans frontières contests, from the first in 1965 through the last in 1999, making Italy the only country to never miss any year in the contest. They won the International Finals four times and they are the winners of the last contest, thanks to Bolzano-Südtirol.

Participation in the international finals

Notes

References

Jeux sans frontières